Kevin Sussman (born December 4, 1970) is an American actor and comedian. He played Walter on the ABC comedy-drama Ugly Betty and Stuart Bloom on the CBS sitcom The Big Bang Theory. Starting with the sixth season of The Big Bang Theory, he was promoted to a series regular.

Early life
Sussman is one of four brothers born to Jewish parents. He grew up in Staten Island and graduated from New Dorp High School. He attended the College of Staten Island for one year and went on to graduate from the American Academy of Dramatic Arts in Manhattan. He later studied with acting teacher Uta Hagen for four years.

Career
Sussman got his start in commercials, playing geeks or nerds, during the dot-com boom for companies such as FedEx. At the time, he worked as a computer consultant. In 1999, he made his film debut in Liberty Heights as Alan Joseph Zuckerman. Sussman moved to Los Angeles when he was cast in Ugly Betty. He played the character Stuart Bloom on The Big Bang Theory from 2009 to the series end in May 2019.

In 2011 and 2012, he worked with The Big Bang Theory co-star John Ross Bowie to create two television comedies: The Ever After Part (FOX) and The Second Coming of Rob (CBS).

Filmography

Film

Television

References

External links

1970 births
Living people
American male film actors
American male television actors
American male voice actors
Male actors from New York City
People from Staten Island
20th-century American male actors
21st-century American male actors
College of Staten Island alumni
American Academy of Dramatic Arts alumni
American male comedy actors
Jewish American male actors
New Dorp High School alumni
21st-century American Jews